Thomas Brennan (1886 – 22 January 1953) was an Irish Fianna Fáil politician who sat for 9 years as a Teachta Dála (TD) for Wicklow.

A building contractor before entering politics, He fought in the Irish War of Independence as a Commandant in the North Wexford Brigade.

Brennan first stood for election to Dáil Éireann at the 1943 general election, but failed to win a seat. The following year, at the 1944 general election, he unseated his Fianna Fáil colleague Christopher Byrne and took his seat in the 15th Dáil. He was re-elected at the 1948 election and again at the 1951 general election, but died in office on 22 January 1953.

The by-election for his seat was held on 18 June 1953, and won by the Fine Gael candidate Mark Deering. At the 1954 general election his son Paudge Brennan was elected for Fianna Fáil, beginning a 30-year career in the Oireachtas.

See also
Families in the Oireachtas

References

1886 births
1953 deaths
Fianna Fáil TDs
Members of the 12th Dáil
Members of the 13th Dáil
Members of the 14th Dáil
Politicians from County Wicklow
Irish Republican Army (1919–1922) members